The Paris–Luxembourg was a professional cycle race held as a stage race between Paris and Luxembourg.

Winners

Recurring sporting events established in 1963
1963 establishments in France
Cycle races in France
Defunct cycling races in France
Recurring sporting events disestablished in 1970
Men's road bicycle races
1970 disestablishments in France
Defunct cycling races in Luxembourg
1963 establishments in Luxembourg
1970 disestablishments in Luxembourg
Cycle races in Luxembourg
Super Prestige Pernod races